Sardi's is a continental restaurant located at 234 West 44th Street, between Broadway and Eighth Avenue, in the Theater District of Manhattan, New York City. Sardi's opened at its current location on March 5, 1927.  It is known for the caricatures of Broadway celebrities on its walls, of which there are over a thousand.

Sardi's was founded by Vincent Sardi Sr. and his wife Jenny Pallera, who had previously operated a restaurant nearby between 1921 and 1926. To attract customers, Sardi Sr. hired Russian refugee Alex Gard to draw caricatures in exchange for free food. Even after Gard's death, Sardi's continued to commission caricatures. Following the death of Vincent Sardi Sr. in 1969, Sardi's started to decline in the 1980s, eventually being sold off in 1986. After closing temporarily in 1990, it reopened with new staff.

The restaurant is today considered an institution in Broadway theatre. Over the years, the restaurant became known as a pre- and post-theater hangout, as well as a location for opening night parties, and was where the idea of the Tony Award was devised.

Creation and early years
Melchiorre Pio Vincenzo "Vincent" Sardi Sr. (born in San Marzano Oliveto, Italy, on December 23, 1885; died November 19, 1969) and his wife Eugenia ("Jenny") Pallera (born in Castell'Alfero, Italy, on July 14, 1889; died November 17, 1978) opened their first eatery, The Little Restaurant, in the basement of 246 West 44th Street in 1921. When that building was slated for demolition in 1926 to make way for the St. James Theatre, Sardi and Pallera accepted an offer from the theater magnates, the Shubert brothers, to relocate to a new building the brothers were erecting down the block. The new restaurant, Sardi's, opened March 5, 1927.

When business slowed after the move, Vincent Sardi sought a gimmick to attract customers. Recalling the movie star caricatures that decorated the walls of Joe Zelli's, a Parisian restaurant and jazz club, Sardi decided to recreate that effect in his establishment. He hired a Russian refugee named Alex Gard (1898–1948; born Alexis Kremkoff in Kazan, Russia) to draw Broadway celebrities. Sardi and Gard drew up a contract that stated Gard would make the caricatures in exchange for one meal per day at the restaurant. The first official caricature by Gard was of Ted Healy, the vaudevillian of Three Stooges fame. When Sardi's son, Vincent Sardi Jr. (1915–2007), took over restaurant operations in 1947, he offered to change the terms of Gard's agreement. Gard refused and continued to draw the caricatures in exchange for meals,  ultimately drawing over 720 caricatures for Sardi's until his 1948 death.

Height of popularity

Frequent mentions of the restaurant in newspaper columns by Walter Winchell and Ward Morehouse added to Sardi's growing popularity. Winchell and Morehouse belonged to a group of newspapermen, press agents, and drama critics who met for lunch regularly at Sardi's and referred to themselves as the Cheese Club.  Heywood Broun, Mark Hellinger, press agent Irving Hoffman, actor George Jessel, and Ring Lardner  were also Cheese Club members. In fact, it was Hoffman who first brought Alex Gard to Sardi's for lunch at the Cheese Club table. Gard drew caricatures of the Cheese Club members, and Vincent Sardi hung them above their table. It was then that Sardi recalled the drawings at Zelli's and made his deal with Gard.

The restaurant became known as a pre- and post-theater hangout, as well as a location for opening night parties. Vincent Sardi, a theater lover, kept the restaurant open much later than others in the area to accommodate Broadway performers' schedules. Sardi's grossed about $1 million in annual revenue by the late 1950s. Vincent Sardi died in 1969, aged 83, and control of Sardi's passed to his son Vincent Jr. Under Vincent Jr.'s leadership, food reviewers started to criticize the eatery as being "sooty". Mimi Sheraton, a New York Times food writer, said in 1981 that "food, service and housekeeping at Sardi's leave almost everything to be desired".

The Sardi family owned the restaurant for six decades, until 1984, when Sardi's was sold to Show Biz Restaurant Inc. At the time, George Lang Corporation was planning a renovation of the restaurant in the near future. However, in June 1985, Vincent Sardi Jr. indicated that the deal had not been approved and that he still owned the restaurant; according to industry experts, he was asking for at least $7 million from a potential buyer. Vincent Jr. sold Sardi's to Ivan Bloch, who headed Sardi's Inc., in September 1986. After Bloch failed to make payments and defaulted in April 1989, his debt was restructured. Ownership was transferred to Broadway Holdings Inc., which acquired Sardi's Inc. When the owners defaulted again in June 1989, Sardi's filed for bankruptcy, and in June 1990, temporarily closed. The restaurant reopened in November 1990 with new staff. Following the reopening, reviews of Sardi's tended to be more positive.

While the Sardi family was Italian, their restaurant's cuisine is not; rather it tends toward "English food", a Continental menu. In 1957, Vincent Sardi Jr. collaborated with Helen Bryson to compile a cookbook of Sardi's recipes. Curtain Up at Sardi's contains nearly 300 recipes ranging from a grilled cheese sandwich to a Champagne cocktail. By 1987, however, Zagat was describing the food as "a culinary laughing stock." One customer who was surveyed called Sardi's "the longest running gag on Broadway."

Other locations 
Several alternate locations of Sardi's have been opened over the years, but all were later closed or sold off. In 1932, a Los Angeles location of Sardi's opened on Hollywood Boulevard, where it was similarly popular with celebrities. It was destroyed in a fire in 1936. Vincent Sardi Sr. opened Sardi's East, a French-food eatery, at 123 East 54th Street in 1958. It was sold in 1968 and renamed the Jockey Club. In 1974, it was announced that Vincent Sardi Jr. would open a 700-seat Dinner‐Theater in Baldwin, Nassau County, New York. The Dinner-Theater opened in September 1974; however, it was unprofitable and only operated for two years before closing.

Today

Sardi's is the birthplace of the Tony Award; after Antoinette Perry's death in 1946, her partner, theatrical producer and director Brock Pemberton, was eating lunch at Sardi's when he came up with the idea of a theater award to be given in Perry's honor. For many years Sardi's was the location where Tony Award nominations were announced. Vincent Sardi Sr. received a special Tony Award in 1947, the first year of the awards, for "providing a transient home and comfort station for theatre folk at Sardi's for 20 years." In 2004, Vincent Sardi Jr. received a Tony Honor for Excellence in the Theatre. Sardi's is also the venue for the presentation of the Outer Critics Circle Awards, as well as many other Broadway events, press conferences, and celebrations.

In a 2000 interview, composer Stephen Sondheim cited Sardi's while lamenting the changing climate of New York theater.  Asked about the Broadway community, Sondheim replied, "There's none whatsoever. The writers write one show every two or three years. Who congregates at Sardi's?  What is there to congregate about? Shows just sit in theaters and last." Sardi's closed temporarily in March 2020 due to the COVID-19 pandemic in New York City, reopening on December 25, 2021.

Caricatures 

During his lifetime, Alex Gard drew over 720 caricatures for Sardi's. Gard died in 1948 after suffering a heart attack in the subway. After Gard, John Mackey took over drawing for the restaurant, but was soon replaced by Donald Bevan. Bevan, a U.S. Army Air Forces veteran and an illustrator, did the drawings for over 20 years, when he retired. He was replaced by Richard Baratz, a banknote and certificate engraver by profession, who was originally from Brooklyn and had been hired through a contest for a new caricaturist. Baratz, who lives in Pennsylvania, continues to the present day as the Sardi's caricaturist. As of 2010, there are more than 1,300 celebrity caricatures on display.

According to actor Robert Cuccioli's spokesperson Judy Katz, in an interview with Playbill: "On the day James Cagney died, his caricature was stolen from the Sardi's wall. Since then, when drawings are done, the originals go into a vault, and two copies are made. One goes to the lucky subject of the caricature, the other up on the Sardi's wall. This way, potential thieves won't have their moment."

In 1979, Vincent Sardi Jr. donated a collection of 227 caricatures from the restaurant to the Billy Rose Theatre Collection of The New York Public Library for the Performing Arts.

Radio broadcasts
On March 8, 1947, Vincent Sardi Jr. began a radio show broadcast live from the Sardi's dining room, called Luncheon at Sardi's. It was hosted originally by Bill Slater. Subsequent hosts were Tom Slater, Ray Heatherton and Arlene Francis. Currently, on WOR Radio, Joan Hamburg occasionally does broadcasts from Sardi's.

See also
 Breakfast in Hollywood
 Bright Lights of 1944

References

Notes

Further reading

External links

 Sardi's (Restaurant) caricatures, 1927-1952?, held by the Billy Rose Theatre Division, New York Public Library for the Performing Arts
 Sardi's (Restaurant) papers, 1913-1976, held by the Billy Rose Theatre Division, New York Public Library for the Performing Arts

Broadway theatre
Restaurants in Manhattan
Restaurants established in 1927
Times Square
1927 establishments in New York City